The St. Cloud State Huskies women's ice hockey program represent St. Cloud State University during the 2017-18 NCAA Division I women's ice hockey season.

Recruiting

2017–18 Huskies

Standings

Schedule

|-
!colspan=12 style=""| Regular Season

|-
!colspan=12 style=""| WCHA Tournament

Awards and honors

References

St. Cloud State
St. Cloud State Huskies women's ice hockey seasons
St. Cloud
2017 in sports in Minnesota
2018 in sports in Minnesota